Dactylanthus may refer to:
 Dactylanthus (plant), genus with just one species: Dactylanthus taylorii, a parasitic plant from New Zealand
 Dactylanthus (cnidarian), genus with just one species: Dactylanthus antarcticus, a sea anemone from Antarctica and southern South America